Amurzet is a rural locality (a selo) and the administrative center of Oktyabrsky District of the Jewish Autonomous Oblast, Russia, located  from Birobidzhan. Population:

History
It was founded in 1929 as a large collective farm. Specifically, Amurzet has a history of Jewish settlement in the JAO since its inception. Concerning the period 1929 through 1939, Amurzet was the center of Jewish settlement for the area south of Birobidzhan.

Jewish community
The present day Jewish community members hold Kabalat Shabbat ceremonies and gatherings that feature songs in Yiddish, Jewish cuisine, and discussions on Jewish culture. Today, many descendants of the founders of this settlement have left their native village, while others remain. Present day inhabitants of Amurzet, especially those having relatives in Israel, are learning more about the traditions and roots of the Jewish people and religion.

See also
History of the Jews in the Jewish Autonomous Oblast

References

Rural localities in the Jewish Autonomous Oblast
Amurzet
Populated places established in 1929